Kienapple v R, [1975] 1 S.C.R. 729 is a leading decision of the Supreme Court of Canada that established the rule against multiple convictions known as the Kienapple principle. Justice Bora Laskin, for the court, held that an accused cannot be convicted of two offences where they both arise out of substantially the same facts.

John Edward Kienapple was charged with rape and unlawful sexual intercourse with a female under 14 years of age. At trial he was convicted on both charges. On appeal to the Supreme Court his conviction for unlawful sexual intercourse was overturned.

See also
 R v Prince
 Res judicata

External links
 Full text available at lexum and canLII

Supreme Court of Canada cases
Supreme Court of Canada case articles without infoboxes
1975 in Canadian case law
Canadian criminal case law